Port Elizabeth, like most South African cities, uses Metropolitan or "M" routes for important intra-city routes, a layer below National (N) roads and Regional (R) roads. Each city's M roads are independently numbered.

These roads naturally interact with Port Elizabeth's N and R roads. The N2 enters Port Elizabeth from the west before veering north when it reaches the coastline of Algoa Bay. The R102 roughly parallels the N2, but runs further south, into the city centre before turning north. The R75 leaves the R102 as it begins leaving the city centre from the north, and heads in a roughly north-west direction towards Uitenhage. It then veers north skirting the town centre and continuing on towards Graaff-Reinet.

Of the five three-digit R roads in the city, one, the R333 seems to be no longer in use, with the road instead described as the M6. The R334 starts just north of the city, leaving the N2 and heading in a westerly direction. It runs through the northern parts of Motherwell township before passing through the centre of Uitenhage and then exiting the town in a south-westerly direction, returning to the N2. Part of the R334 is also designated as the M20. The R335 leaves the N2 at the level of the northern suburb of St. George's Strand. It initially heads west-north-west through Motherwell, before veering north, crossing the R334 and heading towards Addo, Eastern Cape. The R367 seems to have partly been renumbered the M19. In full, it branches from the R102 at Swartkops, a suburb in the north-east of Port Elizabeth, and heads in a roughly west-north-west direction towards Uitenhage, crossing the R75 and ending in the city centre at the R334. The R368 also seems to be phased out, and branches from the R75 in the suburb of Algoa Park and parallels its course, except that it continues to the city centre, likewise ending at the R334.

Table of M roads

See also 
 Numbered Routes in South Africa

References 

Transport in Port Elizabeth
Roads in South Africa